Paula G. Allen-Meares (born 1948) is an American academic who served as the chancellor of the University of Illinois Chicago from 2009 to 2015. She has a background in social work.

Allen-Meares was raised in Buffalo, New York. She completed her undergraduate education at SUNY Buffalo, and then undertook postgraduate studies in social work at the University of Illinois at Urbana–Champaign (UIUC). While completing her doctorate, she worked for the Illinois Department of Children and Family Services. She joined the UIUC faculty in 1975, and in 1990 was made dean of the School of Social Work. In 1993, Allen-Meares joined the University of Michigan as dean of the School of Social Work. She also chair of the University Health Sciences Council. During her tenure, the School of Social Work's endowment increased from $1 million to $42.3 million.

Allen-Meares's appointment as chancellor of the University of Illinois Chicago (UIC) was announced in June 2008, and her term commenced in January 2009. As chancellor, she successfully lobbied for UIC to host the Barack Obama Presidential Center. Allen-Meares's initial five-year term was extended to January 2015, but not renewed thereafter; in August 2014, the UIC faculty senate had passed a motion of no confidence 44–9. She received an exit bonus of $98,440 on top of a $437,244 annual salary, which was criticized by faculty representatives.

See also
 List of women presidents or chancellors of co-ed colleges and universities

References

1948 births
Living people
African-American academics
American academic administrators
American social workers
Heads of universities and colleges in the United States
Leaders of the University of Illinois
People from Buffalo, New York
University at Buffalo alumni
University of Illinois School of Social Work alumni
University of Michigan faculty
Women heads of universities and colleges
21st-century African-American people
20th-century African-American people
Members of the National Academy of Medicine